The men's individual all-around competition was one of eight events for male competitors in artistic gymnastics at the 1988 Summer Olympics in Seoul. The qualification and final rounds took place on September 18, 20, and 22nd at the Olympic Gymnastics Hall. There were 89 competitors from 23 nations. Each nation could send a team of 6 gymnasts or up to 3 individual gymnasts. The event was won by Vladimir Artemov of the Soviet Union, the nation's sixth victory in the event (then the most of any nation; Japan tied this total in 2016). The Soviets swept the medals, with Valeri Liukin taking silver and Dmitri Bilozertchev bronze. It was the third medal sweep in the men's all-around; France had done it in 1900 and Japan in 1972.

Background

This was the 20th appearance of the men's individual all-around. The first individual all-around competition had been held in 1900, after the 1896 competitions featured only individual apparatus events. A men's individual all-around has been held every Games since 1900.

Two of the top 10 gymnasts from the 1984 Games returned, both from China: bronze medalist Li Ning and seventh-place finisher Xu Zhiqiang. The reigning (1987) World Champion was Dmitry Bilozerchev of the Soviet Union; his teammate Yuri Korolyov had won in 1985 and placed second behind Bilozerchev in 1987 but missed the Games due to an Achilles injury. Vladimir Artemov, also of the Soviet Union, had finished just behind Korolyov both years (second at the World Championships in 1985 and third in 1987), and was competing in the 1988 Olympics. The only non-Soviet to earn a medal in the men's all-around at either World Championship was East German Sylvio Kroll (third in 1985).

Chinese Taipei made its debut in the event. France made its 18th appearance, most among nations.

Competition format

The competition format followed the preliminary and final format introduced in 1972, with the limit on the number of finalists per nation added in 1976. All entrants in the gymnastics competitions performed both a compulsory exercise and a voluntary exercise for each apparatus. The scores for all 12 exercises were summed to give an individual all-around preliminary score. Half of the scores from the preliminary carried over to the final, with the top 36 gymnasts advancing to the individual all-around final—except that each nation was limited to 3 finalists. There, each of the finalists performed another exercise on each apparatus. The sum of these scores plus half of the preliminary score resulted in a final total.

Each exercise was scored from 0 to 10; thus, the preliminary apparatus scores ranged from 0 to 20 each and the total preliminary score from 0 to 120. With half of the preliminary score and six more exercises scored 0 to 10, the final total was also from 0 to 120.

The preliminary exercise scores were also used for qualification for the apparatus finals.

Schedule

All times are Korea Standard Time adjusted for daylight savings (UTC+10)

Results

Eighty-nine gymnasts competed in the all-around during the compulsory and optional rounds on September 18 and 20. The thirty-six highest scoring gymnasts advanced to the final on September 22. Each country was limited to three competitors in the final. Half of the points earned by each gymnast during both the compulsory and optional rounds carried over to the final. This constitutes each gymnast's "prelim" score.

References

External links
Official Olympic Report
www.gymnasticsresults.com

Men's artistic individual all-around
Men's events at the 1988 Summer Olympics